Glucosaminyl 3-O-sulfotransferase may refer to:

 (heparan sulfate)-glucosamine 3-sulfotransferase 1, an enzyme
 (heparan sulfate)-glucosamine 3-sulfotransferase 2, an enzyme
 (heparan sulfate)-glucosamine 3-sulfotransferase 3, an enzyme